Earl Dittman (born circa 1960) is the owner and film critic for Wireless Magazines, a Houston, Texas-based company that he has said includes five pop culture publications (such as Behind the Screen and Rhythm and Groove) distributed in various markets in the United States. He is also a freelance writer, primarily for entertainment-related features.

Dittman is known for his overwhelmingly positive and heavily quoted review blurbs, especially for widely panned movies. Film and media critics have alleged that Dittman's reviews are intended to get him mentioned in international advertising and press material for movies. Dittman was named as one of top ten "movie quote whores" of 2005.

References

External links 
 Movie Quote Whores by Jim Emerson, Roger Ebert's website editor
 Ask Yahoo!: Has the movie critic from "Wireless Magazines" ever disliked a movie?

American film critics
American magazine publishers (people)
Living people
American male non-fiction writers
21st-century American non-fiction writers
21st-century American male writers
1960s births